The  1904 Washington University football team represented Washington University in St. Louis as an independent during the 1904 college football season. Led by L. W. Boynton in his second and final season as head coach, the team compiled a record of 4–7 and was outscored by its opponents 162 to 85. Washington University played all 11 of its games at home in St. Louis, at the newly-opened World's Fair Stadium—now known as Francis Olympic Field—on the grounds of the Louisiana Purchase Exposition, also known as the St. Louis World's Fair. The stadium also hosted the 1904 Summer Olympics.

Schedule

References

Washington University
Washington University Bears football seasons
Washington University football